Bolqan-e Sofla (also Romanized as Bolqān-e Soflá; also known as Bolqān-e Pā’īn) is a village in Golian Rural District, in the Central District of Shirvan County, North Khorasan Province, Iran. At the 2006 census, its population was 153, in 37 families.

References 

Populated places in Shirvan County